Vindication Island is a small uninhabited island in the South Sandwich Islands. The island is mostly ice free.

Geography
This small island is part of the Candlemas Islands subgroup of the South Sandwich Islands.
Its southwesternmost point is Knob Point, charted in 1930 by Discovery Investigations personnel on the Discovery II, and probably so named because a conspicuous height of land overlooks the point. Splinter Crag forms its northern peak.

Vindication Island is the eroded remains of a former volcanic group.

Unlike neighbouring Candlemas Island, where there is volcanic activity, the volcano on Vindication has shown no sign of activity for over 10,000 years.

Buddha Rock lies 0.3 nautical miles (0.6 km) west of Vindication Island. Leafvein Gulch is a valley 0.5 nautical miles (1 km) long draining the northeastern part of Vindication Island.

See also 
 List of Antarctic and subantarctic islands
 Pothole Gulch
 Santa Rock

References

External links
volcano.und.edu

Islands of the South Sandwich Islands
Volcanoes of the Atlantic Ocean
Volcanoes of South Georgia and the South Sandwich Islands
Uninhabited islands of South Georgia and the South Sandwich Islands